Duisburg: Industrial culture on the Rhine is the name of the third theme route of the Industrial Heritage Trail.

References

 Martina Will: Duisburg: Industriekultur am Rhein. (Themenroute 3 der "Route der Industriekultur"). Kommunalverband Ruhrgebiet, Essen. 1999. 96 S. (Broschüre)

Duisburg
Industrial history of Germany